Nightmares Unhinged is a horror fiction anthology edited by Joshua Viola, published on September 8, 2015. It is the first anthology from Hex Publishers.

About
Nightmares Unhinged is a horror anthology with 20 short stories by award-winning and bestselling authors, including writers like Stephen Graham Jones, Jason Heller, Keith Ferrell, Steve Rasnic Tem, Edward Bryant, Jeanne C. Stein, Steve Alten and many others. The book is edited by Josh Viola (author of Blackstar (novel) and The Bane of Yoto). "Nightmares Unhinged" is dedicated to Bram Stoker Award-winning author Melanie Tem. The book was named one of the Best Indie Books of 2016 by Kirkus Reviews, where it also received a starred review.

"Spectrum 22", associated with the Spectrum Awards, is featuring the cover art, which was painted by Aaron Lovett.

Fear the Walking Dead
On December 14, 2016, AMC's The Walking Dead spinoff series, Fear the Walking Dead, announced via social media that Nightmares Unhinged's cover art inspired the show.

Release details
 2015, United States, Hex Publishers , Pub date August 11, 2015, Trade paperback

References

2015 anthologies
Horror anthologies